The Reformation of the Suffragettes is a 1911 French silent comedy film produced by Gaumont Film Company.

Plot
Fed up with their husbands' penchant for fishing, the women of a village expel them and attempt to live on their own. But they find this impossible to do, and in the end, welcome their husbands back.

References

External link
 

1911 films
1910s French films